The 2000–01 South-West Indian Ocean cyclone season was a fairly quiet season with only five named storms, although there was an additional unnamed tropical storm and two subtropical cyclones with gale-force winds. It started early, with a tropical disturbance forming on August 1 – the first day of the cyclone year. However, the first named storm, Ando, was not named until January 2, which at the time was the 4th latest on record. Ando would become the most intense cyclone of the year, reaching peak winds of  according to the Météo-France office (MFR) on Réunion, the official Regional Specialized Meteorological Center for the basin. The agency tracked storms south of the equator and west of 90°E to the east coast of Africa.

In addition to being the strongest storm, Cyclone Ando was one of two deadly storms during the season. The rains led to flooding that killed two people. Ando was one of three storms to attain tropical cyclone status – winds of at least  – in the month of January. The others were Bindu, which alternated its trajectory several times over open waters, and Charly, which rapidly weakened after encountering hostile wind shear. The next storm to form was Tropical Cyclone Dera, which intensified near Mozambique in early March and killed two people there due to flooding rains. It later moved southward through the Mozambique Channel, maintaining its intensity unusually far to the south before becoming extratropical. There was a month of inactivity in March, including three weeks in which there were no storms worldwide, the first such instance. Subsequently, two storms formed in early April; one was a small, unnamed tropical storm, and the other was Severe Tropical Storm Evariste, which brought light rainfall to two islands. The season ended with an unusual subtropical storm forming rapidly in the southern Mozambique Channel on June 19, the only such storm to form in that body of water in the month. It became the strongest storm on record for so late in the season, although it weakened without affecting land, dissipating on June 24.


Season summary 

During the season, the Météo-France office (MFR) on Réunion island issued warnings in tropical cyclones within the basin. The agency estimated intensity through the Dvorak technique, and warned on tropical cyclones in the region from the coast of Africa to 90° E, south of the equator to 30° S. At the time, the cyclone year was from August 1 to July 31 of the subsequent year. The Joint Typhoon Warning Center (JTWC), which is a joint United States Navy – United States Air Force task force, also issued tropical cyclone warnings for the southwestern Indian Ocean in an unofficial capacity.

Aside from a tropical disturbance in August, the season began later than usual, the fourth consecutive season to do so. At the time it had the 4th latest start on record for the first named storm. Only about 20% of seasons have their first storm form after the middle of December, and the first named storm of this season, Ando, did not become a tropical storm until early January. However, January was active with three tropical cyclones, two of which became intense tropical cyclones, due to the active phase of the Madden–Julian oscillation (MJO). February returned to a period of inactivity, and generally there was minimal convection across the basin due to unusually dry air. This was spread by a powerful and persistent ridge that extended eastward from Madagascar, as well as an inactive phase of the MJO. Drought conditions occurred on Réunion due to the lack of rainfall. After three weeks of no tropical cyclones developing worldwide, an event unseen since 1995, the tropics became active again in early April.

In contrast with the busy preceding season, this season had much lower activity than usual, with only 36 days in which there was a tropical storm or cyclone active; this was 17 less than normal. However, the number of days with a tropical cyclone was slightly above normal at 15. In general, the southern hemisphere as a whole had the least active season since 1954. There were only five named storms, only the fifth such time since the beginning of the satellite era in 1967. As most storms formed toward the eastern periphery of the basin, damage was much less than the preceding year.

Systems

Intense Tropical Cyclone Ando 

Associated convection, or thunderstorms, gradually organized into a central dense overcast, and the system became Tropical Disturbance 3 at 06:00 UTC on December 31. The upper-level environment generally favored further development, but the system failed to develop more initially due to some easterly wind shear. A large ridge to the south steered the nascent disturbance to the west-southwest. After the shear subsided, the system intensified into a moderate tropical storm on January 2, given the name "Ando" by the Mauritius Meteorological Service.

Ando rapidly intensified after forming and attained tropical cyclone status early on January 4, developing an eye in the center of the thunderstorms and outflow to the east. A tropical low over the southern Mozambique Channel weakened the ridge, causing Ando to turn more to the southwest. According to the JTWC, however, Ando attained peak 1 minute winds of  late on January 5. On January 8, Ando weakened below tropical cyclone status, and the convection increasingly separated from the circulation while turning to the southeast. On January 10, the storm became extratropical, although the remnants turned back to the northwest due to the ridge, dissipating on January 13.

As a developing storm, Ando produced some heavy rain between December 30 and January 2 over Seychelles. Swaziland also reported that Ando drew moisture from the continent, aggravating a persistent dry spell. Passing north of Réunion, Ando produced gusts of  along the coast, but  was recorded at Plaine des Cafres in the mountainous peaks. Most parts of the island did not receive much rain, with the exception of mountainous peaks due to orographic lift, particularly after the center passed to the west. Pas de Bellecombe at an elevation of  reported  over 48 hours. The rains caused flooding and some landslides, which washed away one house and killed two people. Ando also damaged crops and killed several livestock. High waves injured several people, several of whom required rescue from lifeguards.

Tropical Cyclone Bindu 

With a ridge to the south, the system moved generally westward. A nearby ship confirmed that a circulation formed, and on January 3, it crossed 90°E into the south-west Indian Ocean as a tropical disturbance. With easterly wind shear, the system initially remained weak, but convection increased and organized on January 5. On the next day, the disturbance intensified into a tropical depression, although the circulation was still exposed from the thunderstorms at that time. After turning to the southwest, wind shear decreased, and the depression became Moderate Tropical Storm Bindu on January 7. On the same day, the JTWC also initiated advisories as Tropical Cyclone 05S. Moving around the ridge to the south, Bindu slowly intensified, developing outflow and improved rainbands. Early on January 9, the MFR upgraded the storm to tropical cyclone status as an eye  in diameter formed. The next day, Bindu weakened due to increased wind shear, causing the circulation to be exposed from the convection and for the cyclone to be downgraded into a severe tropical storm.

The building ridge caused the storm to slow and turn back to the west. After the formerly hostile shear relaxed, Bindu became a tropical cyclone again on January 11, redeveloping an eye. By that time, the cyclone had turned back to the south-southwest. Drier air and wind shear resulted in weakening, and Bindu was downgraded to a severe tropical storm on January 14. The MFR downgraded Bindu to tropical depression status on January 16. An approaching trough turned the system to the south on the next day, and Bindu became extratropical late on January 17. The remnants turned sharply eastward due to a ridge, later looping back to the west on January 20. Another trough turned the storm southward on January 21 and absorbed the circulation the next day.

Intense Tropical Cyclone Charly 

A small circulation formed north of the Cocos Islands on January 8 within the near-equatorial trough. Persistent wind shear prevented much strengthening, and the circulation crossed into the south-west Indian Ocean on January 16. Another increase in convection merited its classification as a tropical disturbance on the next day, which organized into a central dense overcast. Slow development continued, allowing the disturbance to become a tropical depression and later Tropical Storm Charly on January 19. On the same day, the JTWC also began tracking it as Tropical Cyclone 06S. Taking a track similar to earlier Tropical Cyclone Bindu, the storm moved southwestward around a ridge to the south. Charly gradually developed outflow and increasingly organized convection due to decreasing wind shear. A ragged eye formed on January 20 and became better defined, and early on January 21, Charly intensified into a tropical cyclone.

Late on January 22, the wind shear and dry air increased while waters became cooler, all of which became detrimental to the storm's structure. The eye rapidly dissipated as the convection dwindled, and within 24 hours of peak intensity, Charly was downgraded to tropical storm status. By that time, the circulation was exposed from the thunderstorms, and Charly weakened to tropical depression status on January 25. Caught in the weak low-level flow, the circulation moved erratically, first to the west, then drifting before turning to the southeast. It continued to produce some convection during this time, which spread rainfall over Mauritius and Réunion. A cold front swept Charly to the southeast, absorbing it on January 31.

Tropical Cyclone Dera 

After an extended period of inactivity lasting nearly a month, the ITCZ produced an area of convection on March 1 between Diego Garcia and the Seychelles. There were initially two weak circulations, although the one south-southwest of Diego Garcia ultimately became Cyclone Dera. It moved southwestward without much development at first due to hostile wind shear, with the circulation often exposed from the thunderstorms. On March 4, the system developed into a tropical disturbance off the northeast coast of Madagascar. It weakened and became indistinct over land, emerging into the Mozambique Channel near Nosy Be as a weak low. Convection gradually increased across the region as the track shifted westward. Around that time, the thunderstorms began organizing more, allowing the disturbance to intensify into a tropical depression on March 8. With warm waters and an anticyclone providing outflow, the depression quickly intensified, becoming Tropical Storm Dera on March 9 and soon after developing an eye feature. Also on that day, the JTWC initiated advisories on the system as Tropical Cyclone 15S.

On March 10, Dera attained tropical cyclone status, and after a brief bout of wind shear, the eye became better defined. Despite being located unusually far to the south, Dera maintained its intensity due to warm waters, and it accelerated southeastward due to an approaching cold front. Wind shear increased on March 12, and only on that day did water temperatures drop off, causing a marked decrease in intensity and for the eye to dissipate. Late on March 12, Dera became extratropical, which continued southeastward along the cold front.

The precursor of Dera dropped heavy rainfall in Mayotte, reaching  on Pamanzi. The precipitation came in intense squalls, with hourly peaks of  recorded, which flooded rivers and some houses. Heavy rainfall also spread across Mozambique, producing additional river flooding Zambezi in a region that had been flooded for weeks. The floods wrecked dozens of homes and covered many roads, while killing two people.

Severe Tropical Storm Evariste 

The ITCZ became active in late March, spawning several areas of convection across the Indian Ocean and into the adjacent Australian basin. Despite favorable conditions, the system failed to organize at first, although it became Tropical Disturbance 9 on April 2 after the structure improved. Drifting to the southwest and later to the south, the associated convection waxed and waned, finally organizing more on April 4; on that day, the disturbance quickly intensified into Moderate Tropical Storm Evariste. A day prior, the JTWC had initiated advisories on the system as Tropical Cyclone 18S. A trough to the south weakened the ridge, turning the storm to the southwest. A small eye formed on April 5, but later dissipated after an increase in thunderstorm activity. On April 6, increased wind shear from the approaching trough began weakening Evariste and turned it to the south. The convection gradually deteriorated and left the circulation exposed. Late on April 7, the storm suddenly turned southwestward toward a developing low east of Madagascar, although the southwest motion resumed soon after. On April 8, Evariste dissipated, dissipating ahead of the nearby trough.

Stronger winds were recorded on Rodrigues while the storm passed, reaching . Rainfall was minimal, reaching only , and failing to alleviate drought conditions.

Moderate Tropical Storm 10 

It moved west-southwestward, entering the south-west Indian Ocean on April 2, and on the same date the JTWC classified it as Tropical Cyclone 16S. The thunderstorms organized into a small central dense overcast, and there was evidence of an eye feature, suggesting the system could have been much stronger. Although satellite imagery had difficulty in tracking the low-level circulation, a nearby ship on April 3 confirmed the presence of a circulation. Operationally the system was only classified as a tropical depression. After previously moving to the west-southwest, the small storm turned back to the west due to a strengthening ridge to the south. Wind shear increased on April 4, which rapidly dwindled the convection and thereby leaving behind an exposed circulation. It underwent the Fujiwhara effect with a larger disturbance to the east, causing the system to turn back to the north and dissipate on April 5.

Subtropical Depression 11 

Similar to Subtropical Depression 13 in April 2000, there was an unusual subtropical cyclone that formed in June at the end of the season. A trough exited South Africa on June 18 with an associated frontal wave in the southern Mozambique Channel. On the next day, the system separated from the front and became a cut-off low. It moved north-northwestward along the eastern periphery of a ridge in southern Africa, becoming a subtropical depression on June 20. The associated convection initially diminished, although the thunderstorms redeveloped due to the atmospheric instability in the region. As such, the structure became more tropical, with a small central dense overcast forming over the circulation only  in diameter. The JTWC initiated advisories on June 21 as Tropical Cyclone 12S. The small size of the storm merited the MFR calling it a "midget cyclone", with a small eye forming late on June 21. Despite the structure, the convection was shallow, which brought uncertainty to the true intensity of the storm. Turning to the northeast and east, the subtropical storm rapidly weakened on June 22 to depression status after the environment became hostile, and the convection largely dissipated. The exposed low turned northwestward on June 23, dissipating the next day.

The storm was the only one on record to form in the Mozambique Channel in June. In addition, it was the strongest storm to form so late in the season.

Other systems 

At that time, an associated circulation was exposed to the east of the thunderstorms. At 06:00 UTC that day, the MFR initiated advisories on Tropical Disturbance 1. With a ridge to the south, the system tracked generally westward, briefly becoming a tropical depression on August 1. An approaching trough weakened the ridge, allowing the depression to turn southwestward. Located in an area of moderate wind shear, the system failed to intensify further, and it dissipated on August 3.

An area of convection formed on November 9 to the east of Diego Garcia, possibly the result of the MJO. Also on November 12, the JTWC classified the system as Tropical Cyclone 02S. It moved to the southwest, but looped back to the east on November 13, during which time the MFR upgraded it to tropical depression status. Later that day, the agency ceased issuing advisories, but the system reorganized on November 14. On November 17, it turned back to the southwest, but the MFR discontinued advisories on the next day.

An area of convection persisted on January 19 off the east coast of Madagascar, which became Tropical Disturbance 6 two days later. Increased wind shear caused the system to weaken as it turned back to the west, dissipating over Madagascar on January 24.

On January 23, a weak tropical low began affecting Mozambique for two days, causing flooding that killed six people. Although newspaper sources indicated that the system was a tropical storm, it remained unclassified by MFR.

The convection gradually organized as the system moved to the south-southwest, steered by a break in the ridge to the south caused by the remnants of Cyclone Charly. Initially the circulation was very broad, and due to its involvement with the monsoon, it resembled a monsoon depression. Early on February 1, the disturbance intensified into a tropical depression while turning more to the south. The system became extratropical on February 3, after increased wind shear weakened the convection. The former depression intensified as an extratropical storm, attaining gale-force winds while accelerating its forward motion due to an approaching trough. The system was no longer tracked after February 6 as it approached the polar latitudes.

On April 17, a weak low exited from the coast of South Africa and moved southeastward over the warm waters of the southern Mozambique Channel. By April 19, it had organized into a subtropical depression and produced gale-force winds. The MFR did not classify the system, however, due to it being located from 33 to 35° S, which was outside of the agency's area of warning responsibility at the time.

Storm names 
A tropical disturbance is named when it reaches moderate tropical storm strength. If a tropical disturbance reaches moderate tropical storm status west of 55°E, then the Sub-regional Tropical Cyclone Advisory Centre in Madagascar assigns the appropriate name to the storm. If a tropical disturbance reaches moderate tropical storm status between 55°E and 90°E, then the Sub-regional Tropical Cyclone Advisory Centre in Mauritius assigns the appropriate name to the storm. A new annual list is used every year so no names are retired.

This was the first season in the basin to feature a list of names comprising a mix of male and female names, in addition to covering the whole basic Latin alphabet from A to Z (prior lists skipped letters Q, U, X, and Z, although the 1983–84 list included a name beginning with Z).

Season effects 
This table lists all of the tropical cyclones and subtropical cyclones that were monitored during the 2010–2011 South-West Indian Ocean cyclone season. Information on their intensity, duration, name, areas affected, primarily comes from RSMC La Réunion. Death and damage reports come from either press reports or the relevant national disaster management agency while the damage totals are given in 2010 or 2011 USD.

|-
| One/01S ||  || bgcolor=#| || bgcolor=#| || bgcolor=#| || None ||  ||  ||
|-
|  ||  || bgcolor=#| || bgcolor=#| || bgcolor=#| || Seychelles, Agaléga, Tromelin, Mauritius, Réunion || None || 2 ||
|-
|  ||  || bgcolor=#| || bgcolor=#| || bgcolor=#| || Rodrigues || None || None ||
|-
|  ||  || bgcolor=#| || bgcolor=#| || bgcolor=#| || Rodrigues, Mauritius, Réunion || None || None ||
|-
|  ||  || bgcolor=#| || bgcolor=#| || bgcolor=#| || Comoros, Mayotte, Madagascar, Europa || None || 2 ||
|-
|  ||  || bgcolor=#| || bgcolor=#| || bgcolor=#| || Rodrigues || None || None ||
|-
| Ten ||  || bgcolor=#| || bgcolor=#| || bgcolor=#| || None || None || None ||
|-
| Eleven/21S ||  || bgcolor=#| || bgcolor=#| || bgcolor=#| || None ||  ||  ||
|-

Contemporaneous seasons 

 List of Southern Hemisphere tropical cyclone seasons
 Atlantic hurricane seasons: 2000, 2001
 Pacific hurricane seasons: 2000, 2001
 Pacific typhoon seasons: 2000, 2001
 North Indian Ocean cyclone seasons: 2000, 2001

References

External links 
 Joint Typhoon Warning Center 2001 ATCR
 2000-01 Best Track Data from Météo France
 2000-2001 Season Summary from Météo France
 July 2000 to June 2001 Tropical Cyclone Summaries and Operational Track Data
 Gary Padgett's Southern Hemisphere 2000-2001 Tropical Cyclone Season Review
 World Meteorological Organization tropical cyclone summary for 2001

 

Articles which contain graphical timelines
South-West Indian Ocean cyclone seasons
2000 SWIO
2001 SWIO